Country Is as Country Does is an extended play of the American country rap musician Colt Ford. It was released on October 6, 2009. The tracks weren't revived in any of his subsequent albums, with the exception of "Huntin' the World", released on the first compilation album Answer to No One: The Colt Ford Classics (2015). The last track, "Dirt Road Anthem", was present in the previous album Ride Through the Country (2008). The first track, "Buck'Em", is the only one to have a music video.

Track listing 
The following information was taken from the AllMusic website.

Chart performance

References 

Colt Ford EPs
2009 debut EPs
Average Joes Entertainment albums